Sir Michael Patrick Cashin,  (29 September 1864 – 30 August 1926) was a Newfoundland businessman and politician.

He was elected to the legislature in 1893 as an independent but worked closely with the Liberal Party. In 1907 he joined the Newfoundland People's Party of Sir Edward Patrick Morris and became minister of finance in 1909. When Morris resigned as party leader, Cashin succeeded him. The People's Party had formed a wartime national government which opposition member William F. Lloyd, a Liberal, had joined as minister of justice.

Despite the fact that Cashin had succeeded Morris as leader of the dominant party, the governor appointed Lloyd to the position of prime minister. On 20 May 1919, Cashin, who was still minister of finance, rose and moved a motion of no confidence in the government he was a member of. The motion passed and Cashin became prime minister.

Cashin's government was short-lived, however; the House of Assembly had not seen an election for six years due to the First World War, and a return to the polls was long overdue. An election was held in November 1919 which defeated Cashin's government and elected the opposition Liberals (now called the Liberal Reform Party).

In opposition Cashin changed the name of the People's Party to the Liberal-Labour-Progressive Party before retiring as party leader in 1923. He did not run for re-election in 1924.

Cashin's son, Peter John Cashin, was a prominent Newfoundland politician in his own right and his grandson, Richard Cashin was a federal politician in the 1960s and a trade union leader in the 1970s and 1980s.

He was created a Knight Commander of the Order of the British Empire in 1918.

He died at his home in St. John's on 30 August 1926.

References

 

1864 births
1926 deaths
Canadian Knights Commander of the Order of the British Empire
Knights Commander of the Order of the British Empire
Prime Ministers of the Dominion of Newfoundland
Newfoundland People's Party MHAs